Tabitha Fringe Chase (a.k.a. Tabby Chase; born July 24, 1977) is one of the first US activists investigated by the FBI Joint Terrorism Task Force to come forward publicly alerting the media to the targeting of activists under the USA PATRIOT Act.

FBI incident 
The FBI domestic terrorism investigation began in 2004.  She and her attorney Ken Driggs were interviewed by the FBI in 2005.  Her redacted FBI file was obtained in 2006 by the American Civil Liberties Union via the Freedom of Information Act (FOIA).  The FBI has never commented to the media on her investigation, nor have they ever officially closed the investigation.  The investigation itself was centered entirely upon her political affiliations with no direct indication of any wrongdoing on her part.  No reason for the investigation to have ever begun was released either in the FOIA or to the media.

She was one of two persons who disrobed publicly in protest of the proposed "baggy pants ban" in Atlanta in 2007, creating a media row that helped to stall the legislation in committee.  She is a former employee of The Chamber and The Clermont Lounge.  She is a street medic, a member of the IWW #690 (sex trade workers), a former stripper, a former dominatrix, a bartender, a former fetish club promoter in Atlanta, Georgia with Agoraphobia Productions, a vegan, and web designer.

Notes

References
 ACLU FOIA request PDF
 This is what FBI harassment looks like
 ACLU Georgia Uncovers Pentagon Spying Files
 America's Least Trusted: How a Clermont stripper ended up under FBI surveillance
 'Disgusting' display over undies ban
 Saggy trouser ban hit by race and liberty row
 Atlanta weighs in on baggy pants debate
 Baggy trousers upset Atlanta residents

1977 births
Living people
American dominatrices
COINTELPRO targets
American female erotic dancers
American erotic dancers
Fetish subculture
Nightclub owners
Sex worker activists in the United States
Industrial Workers of the World members